The Lyin' Mouse is a 1937 Warner Bros. Merrie Melodies cartoon directed by Friz Freleng. The short was released on October 16, 1937.

Plot
A mouse is trying to free himself from a trap when a cat arrives. The mouse, desperate to avoid being eaten, asks if the cat has heard the story of "The Lion And The Mouse." He tells a story about a ferocious lion in the jungle who scares all the animals; the mouse has a horn that imitates the lion's roar, and has some fun with it until the lion catches him. The mouse pleads for his life, and the lion, distracted by a bigger catch, agrees. The bigger catch is a trap set by the Frank Cluck expedition; the lion avoids the first trap, but falls for the second, and find himself in a circus lion-taming act (where he put his head inside the tamer's mouth). The mouse happens by, and chews a lion-shaped hole in the lion's wooden cart/cage, setting him free. Back to the cat: moved by this story, he releases the mouse. Just before entering his hole, the mouse yells one last word at the cat: "Sucker!" The cat shrugs and says, "Well, can you imagine that?"

Home media
DVD - Looney Tunes Mouse Chronicles: The Chuck Jones Collection (USA 1995 dubbed print added as a bonus)
VHS - Taz's Jungle Jams (USA 1995 dubbed print)
LaserDisc - The Golden Age of Looney Tunes, Volume 5, Side 3 (USA 1995 dubbed print)
VHS - Videotoons Volume 2

Notes
This short is the first Warner Bros. cartoon to give story credit; in this case, to Tedd Pierce.
This cartoon was re-released into the Blue Ribbon Merrie Melodies program on December 22, 1945.
The ostrich from "Plenty of Money and You" makes a cameo appearance, when the animals run away from the mouse's lion noise. Coincidentally, both shorts with the ostrich were directed by Freleng.

References

External links

1937 films
1937 animated films
Merrie Melodies short films
Animated films about lions
Films about mice and rats
Short films directed by Friz Freleng
Films scored by Carl Stalling
1930s Warner Bros. animated short films
Warner Bros. Cartoons animated short films